Hemistropharia is a genus of agarics of unclear classification, though possibly related to the Hymenogastraceae or Tubarieae. A monotypic genus, it contains the single species Hemistropharia albocrenulata. This species, originally named Agaricus albocrenulatus by American mycologist Charles Horton Peck in 1873, is synonymous with the names Pholiota albocrenulata (Peck) Sacc. and Stropharia albocrenulata (Peck) Kreisel, among others. The genus most closely resembles a typical Pholiota where it was previously classified and described and it causes a decay in trees as does a true Pholiota. Unlike Pholiota, Hemistropharia albocrenulata lacks chrysocystidia, and it has darker basidiospores.

See also
 List of Agaricales genera

References

Hymenogastraceae
Monotypic Agaricales genera